Ratas is an Estonian surname. Notable people with the surname include:

 Endel Ratas (1938–2006), Estonian freedom fighter and politician
 Jüri Ratas (born 1978), Estonian politician
 Rein Ratas (1938–2022), Estonian politician

See also
 

Estonian-language surnames